Saccharum edule is a species of sugarcane, that is a grass in the genus Saccharum with a fibrous stalk that is rich in sugar. It is cultivated in tropical climates in southeastern Asia. It has many common names which include duruka, tebu telor, Fiji asparagus, dule (Fiji), pitpit (Melanesia) and naviso.

The young, unopened flower heads of Saccharum edule is eaten raw, steamed, or toasted, and prepared in various ways in Southeastern Asia, including Fiji and certain island communities of Indonesia.

Description 
Although the plant resembles sugarcane from a distance, the stem is much narrower and the leaves thinner and more flexible. The large flower panicles do not open but remain inside their leaf sheaths forming a dense mass. Saccharum edule is part of the Saccharum officinarum species complex and its genome has been investigated.

Distribution 
Saccharum edule originated in Southeastern Asia and is also grown on various Pacific Islands at heights ranging from sea level to high altitudes.

Uses 
The unopened flower heads of Saccharum edule are gathered and used as a vegetable, it's eaten either raw or cooked. In Fiji, a number of different varieties occur and some grow wild along the riverbank. Children enjoy gathering, roasting and eating the flower heads of the early season red duruka, and later the different varieties of white duruka as they mature in rotation. The flower heads are widely sold in local markets for use as a vegetable. A purple duruka which flowers twice a year has been introduced and become popular and it is proposed that a canning operation be set up to sell this as "Fijian asparagus". The plant is also used for erosion control.

In Papua New Guinea pitpit is eaten cooked in coconut milk.

References 

edule
Flora of Indo-China
Flora of Malesia
Flora of the Pacific
Inflorescence vegetables
Fijian cuisine